Richard Verney, 13th Baron Willoughby de Broke and de jure 21st Baron Latimer (1693 – 11 August 1752) was a peer in the peerage of England.

Richard Verney was born in 1693, the second son of George Verney, 12th Baron Willoughby de Broke (1659–1728), and Margaret Heath, daughter of Sir Thomas Heath at the Verney family seat at Compton Verney House in Warwickshire He inherited the title 13th Baron Willoughby de Broke and 21st Baron Latimer on the death of his father in 1728, his elder brother Thomas having died in 1710. He married twice but his only son died in infancy. Upon his death, on 11 August 1752, the title passed to his nephew John Peyto-Verney who was the son of his younger brother John.

References
 
 ThePeerage

External links
 Compton Verney House website

1693 births
1752 deaths
Richard
13